Hilary Wontner (3 October 1912 – 25 June 1984) was an English television actor. He appeared in many British and American television series and films, which include Crossroads, No Hiding Place, The Avengers, Randall and Hopkirk (Deceased), All Creatures Great and Small, We'll Meet Again and others.

Acting credits

References

External links

1912 births
1984 deaths
English male television actors
20th-century English male actors